Bhāskara (8t-9th v. CE) was an Indian philosopher and proponent of the Bhedabheda school of Vedanta philosophy. He wrote commentaries on the Brahma Sutras, and contested Shankara's doctrine of māyā.

Sources

References

External links 
 The Bhāskara School of Philosophy, by Surendranath Dasgupta From: A History of Indian Philosophy Volume 3
 Andrew J. Nicholson, Internet Encyclopedia of Philosophy: Bhedabheda Vedanta

Vedanta
8th-century Indian philosophers